The Thuringia Cup (German: Thüringenpokal) is an annual football competition in Thuringia, Germany. The Thuringia Football Association (German: Thüringer Fußball-Verband, TFV) is its governing body. The cup winner qualifies for next season's DFB-Pokal. It is one of the 21 regional cup competitions in Germany.

Qualification and competition format
All Thuringian clubs competing in 3. Liga, Regionalliga, NOFV-Oberliga Süd, Thüringenliga and Landesklasse Thüringen are eligible to play in the cup. Additionally the winners of the Bezirkspokal competitions qualify. Starting with the 2007–08 season only one team per club may participate.

Thecompetition consists of 6 rounds played in a knock-out format. There is only one match per round, if scores are level after 90 minutes, there is a 2x15 minutes extra time followed by a penalty shootout, if necessary. Fixtures are determined by a draw. Clubs from 3rd Liga and several other teams (determined by a draw) get a first-round bye.

Finals
The finals:

Records
Record winners are FC Carl Zeiss Jena, having won the title 13 times, followed by FC Rot-Weiß Erfurt (9).

The highest attendance record was set on 15 November 2005 in Erfurt. After rivals FC Rot-Weiß Erfurt and FC Carl Zeiss Jena had only met in the final in the preceding years, they met in the quarter-final of the 2005–06 season. Jena took home a 4–2 penalty shootout win in front of 11,000 spectators.

References

Sources
Deutschlands Fußball in Zahlen,  An annual publication with tables and results from the Bundesliga to Verbandsliga/Landesliga, publisher: DSFS

External links
 Fussball.de: Thuringia Cup
 All results of the Thuringia Cup

Recurring sporting events established in 1991
Football cup competitions in Germany
Football competitions in Thuringia
1991 establishments in Germany